Medical kiosks are computerized, electronic kiosks. Some function as patient check-in stations at hospitals or doctors' offices. Other, more advanced kiosks can perform basic diagnostic tests on patients. Most medical kiosks have touchscreens and can be classified as interactive kiosks.

Check-in Kiosks 
Patient self-check-in kiosks can replace the clerks at the front desk.

Diagnostic Kiosks 
Diagnostic kiosks can be used to address shortages of physicians in rural areas throughout the world.

Staffed vs Unstaffed

Staffed 
Staffed kiosks can do a variety of tests.

Unstaffed 
Unstaffed kiosks require only monthly maintenance.  Although tests can still be done (blood pressure, spirometry, heart rate and ECG, blood glucose, and height/weight/BMI), there is not much variety.

See also
 Common-use self-service
 Interactive kiosk
 K67 kiosk

References 

Kiosks